The Novella Reservoir is the sixth full-length studio album by the American death-doom band Novembers Doom, released in 2007. The overall sound of the album carries on from the musical direction of the previous release The Pale Haunt Departure, while incorporating some heavier and faster death metal elements than before. A special edition of this album contained an 84-page, full-color book entitled "The Wayfaring Chronicles" that features lyrics and history/explanations of the songs and albums, a sticker, a band photo that is autographed and a bag for it all to fit in.

Track listing

Personnel
 Paul Kuhr - vocals
 Chris Wisco - bass, producer, engineering, editing
 Joe Nunez - drums
 Vito Marchese - guitars
 Larry Roberts - guitars

Additional personnel and staff
 Ed "Shreddy" Bethishou - keyboards
 Dan Swanö - mixing
 James Murphy - mastering
 Travis Smith - artwork
 Mark Coatsworth - photography

References

2007 albums
Novembers Doom albums
The End Records albums